The 2013 Zippo 200 at The Glen was the 21st stock car race of the 2013 NASCAR Nationwide Series and the 19th iteration of the event. The race was held on Saturday, August 10, 2013, in Watkins Glen, New York at Watkins Glen International, a 2.45-mile (3.94 km) permanent road course. The race took the scheduled 82 laps to complete. At race's end, Brad Keselowski, driving for Penske Racing, would dominate the race to win his 24th career NASCAR Nationwide Series win and his fourth of the season. To fill out the podium, Sam Hornish Jr. of Penske Racing and Brian Vickers of Joe Gibbs Racing would finish second and third, respectively.

Background 

Watkins Glen International (nicknamed "The Glen") is an automobile race track located in Watkins Glen, New York at the southern tip of Seneca Lake. It was long known around the world as the home of the Formula One United States Grand Prix, which it hosted for twenty consecutive years (1961–1980), but the site has been home to road racing of nearly every class, including the World Sportscar Championship, Trans-Am, Can-Am, NASCAR Sprint Cup Series, the International Motor Sports Association and the IndyCar Series.

Initially, public roads in the village were used for the race course. In 1956 a permanent circuit for the race was built. In 1968 the race was extended to six hours, becoming the 6 Hours of Watkins Glen. The circuit's current layout has more or less been the same since 1971, although a chicane was installed at the uphill Esses in 1975 to slow cars through these corners, where there was a fatality during practice at the 1973 United States Grand Prix. The chicane was removed in 1985, but another chicane called the "Inner Loop" was installed in 1992 after J.D. McDuffie's fatal accident during the previous year's NASCAR Winston Cup event.

The circuit is known as the Mecca of North American road racing and is a very popular venue among fans and drivers. The facility is currently owned by International Speedway Corporation.

Entry list

Practice 
The only practice session was held on Friday, August 9, at 1:40 PM, and would last for two hours and 10 minutes.

Qualifying 
Qualifying was held on Saturday, August 10, at 9:35 AM EST. Each driver would have one lap to set a time.

No drivers would fail to qualify.

Full qualifying results

Race results

Standings after the race 

Drivers' Championship standings

Note: Only the first 12 positions are included for the driver standings.

References 

2013 NASCAR Nationwide Series
NASCAR races at Watkins Glen International
August 2013 sports events in the United States
2013 in sports in New York (state)